John La Fave (born July 13, 1949) is an American politician who served as a member of the Wisconsin State Assembly from the 23rd district from 1993 to 2003.

Early life and education 
Born in Milwaukee, La Fave graduated from Wauwatosa West High School in 1967. He earned a Bachelor of Science degree in education from the University of Wisconsin in 1971.

Career 
He worked as a sales representative and an elementary school teacher before his 1992 election to the Wisconsin State Assembly. After leaving office in 2003, he became the register of deeds for Milwaukee County, Wisconsin.

Personal life 
La Fave has practiced Transcendental Meditation since the late 1960s, and attended a special mass-meditation event at the Maharishi University of Management in Iowa held in the wake of the 9/11 attacks.

Notes

1949 births
Living people
University of Wisconsin–Madison School of Education alumni
Politicians from Milwaukee
Schoolteachers from Wisconsin
Educators from Wisconsin
Businesspeople from Milwaukee
Democratic Party members of the Wisconsin State Assembly